Cory Stone (born March 6, 1972) is an American gridiron football coach and former player. He has worked as an assistant coach with the Toronto Argonauts of the Canadian Football League (CFL).  Stone coached the Argonauts to a victory in the 100th Grey Cup in 2012. He played college football at the University of Tennessee from 1992 to 1994 and professionally in the Arena Football League from 1996 to 2005. Stone has coached in the Arena Football League for the Bakersfield Blitz, Rio Grande Valley Dorados, and Milwaukee Iron.  He has coached college football at Clark Atlanta University.

Early years
Stone played high school football for and graduated from Central High School in Memphis, Tennessee. Attended The University of Tennessee, Knoxville.

College career
Stone then attended the University of Tennessee, where he was a two-year letterman (1992–1994). During his time as a defensive end and defensive tackle, he played in the 1993 Hall of Fame Bowl, 1994 Florida Citrus Bowl, and the 1994 Gator Bowl.

Professional playing career
Stone played in the Arena Football League from 1996 to 2005.

Coaching career

Bakersfield Blitz
Stone began his  professional coaching career in 2006 as defensive line coach for the Bakersfield Blitz. He coached the AFL2 Defensive lineman of the year Jerry Turner.  The Blitz defensive line had three players ranked in the top ten for sacks (Turner led the league 16).

Rio Grande Valley Dorados 
After his time with the Bakersfield, Stone served two seasons as associate head coach/defensive coordinator for the Rio Grande Valley in 1998.  The Dorados won the Southwest Division title with a 15-1 record. The Dorados defense posted several AF2 historic records for most sacks for in a season (58), most sacks in a game (13), and shut out of an opponent 64-0 (Laredo).

Milwaukee Iron 
Stone then served one season as defensive coordinator/defensive line coach for the Iron in 2009.

Clark Atlanta 
Stone then entered the college ranks for two seasons as the defensive line coach for the panthers.  Under Stone coachinhg, the  Panthers were rank number #2 in the nation for TFL's under Stone tutlege in 2010 and 2012 The Pathers also finish in the top twenty for sacks in 2010 and 2011.  He coached defensive lineman Darel Strong to the SIAC all first team in 2011.

Toronto Argonauts 
In 2012, Stone helped lead the Toronto Argonauts to a historic 100th Grey Cup win over the Calgary Stampeders. He held the title for one season as defensive line coach. Rick Foley was named the Most Outstanding Canadian player for the 100th Grey Cup.  Defensive tackle Armond Armstead was selected to the CFL East All Star and CFL All Star teams. Armstead was the only rookie sectioned to the All Star teams under Stones' tutelage.

References

1972 births
Living people
American football defensive ends
American football defensive tackles
Carolina Cobras players
Clark Atlanta Panthers football coaches
Iowa Barnstormers players
New York Dragons players
Tennessee Volunteers football players
Toronto Argonauts coaches
Sportspeople from Memphis, Tennessee
Players of American football from Memphis, Tennessee
Players of Canadian football from Memphis, Tennessee
African-American coaches of American football
African-American players of American football